Mediterranea depressa is a species of air-breathing land snail, a terrestrial pulmonate gastropod mollusk in the family Oxychilidae.

Distribution 
This species is known to occur in the Czech Republic, Ukraine, Germany and other countries.

References

 Sysoev, A. V. & Schileyko, A. A. (2009). Land snails and slugs of Russia and adjacent countries. Sofia/Moskva (Pensoft). 312 pp., 142 plates.

External links
 Sterki, V. (1880). Hyalina depressa n. sp. Nachrichtsblatt der deutschen malakozoologischen Gesellschaft. 12 (10): 104-105. Frankfurt am Main

Mediterranea
Gastropods described in 1880